Odysseas Vlachodimos (Greek: Οδυσσέας Βλαχοδήμος, born 26 April 1994) is a Greek professional footballer who plays as a goalkeeper for Primeira Liga club Benfica and the Greece national team.

Club career

Stuttgart
Born in Stuttgart, Vlachodimos started his football career at VfL Wangen before joining VfB Stuttgart's youth system at the age of seven. Having progressed through the clubs' youth ranks, he then made his debut for VfB Stuttgart II on 25 February 2012 in a 1–0 loss to 1. FC Heidenheim in 3. Liga. At the end of the season he signed his first professional contract with the club, penning a deal until June 2015. Two years later, he extended his contract with VfB until June 2017. Having made over 50 appearances for VfB Stuttgart II, Vlachodimos was afforded his Bundesliga debut against Eintracht Frankfurt on 29 August 2015. With back-up 'keeper Mitchell Langerak out injured, Vlachodimos was included in Stuttgart's match day squad and was brought on as a substitute following the sending off of first-choice goalkeeper Przemysław Tytoń. He made three appearances in total for the senior side but by the end of 2015 had fallen out of favour of new club manager, and former VfB Stuttgart II coach, Jürgen Kramny. Vlachodimos voiced his disapproval of the situation in an interview with German new publication Kicker in December and the following month joined Greek Super League side Panathinaikos where he was reunited with his brother, Panagiotis, who had joined the club earlier in the month.

Panathinaikos
On 26 January 2016, Stuttgart announced that Vlachodimos had completed a transfer to Panathinaikos. As part of the transfer, the full value of which remained undisclosed, it was agreed that Stuttgart would retain a 30% sell-on clause on Vlachodimos. He was handed his debut for the club on 3 April by manager Andrea Stramaccioni, and started in a 3–2 home win against Veria in the league. Having spent the majority of the first half of the following season behind regular 'keeper Luke Steele, Vlachodimos was handed his second start on 27 November and was named man of the match for his performance in a 1–1 draw against Panionios. He started again the following week and kept his first clean sheet for the club in a 1–0 win over PAOK. On 17 May, Vlachodimos was sent off in a play-off match against the same opposition for a spot in the following season's Champions League. PAOK's Amr Warda was dismissed minutes later before a brawl in the second half saw two more players sent off. During the incident, PAOK manager Vladimir Ivić was struck by a beer can thrown from the Panathinaikos crowd and required treatment, ultimately resulting in the match being abandoned.

Benfica
On 18 May 2018, Vlachodimos signed a five-year contract with Portuguese side S.L. Benfica. After he arrived in Lisbon, fellow teammate Bruno Varela seemed to be the first-choice goalkeeper for the 2018–19 season, but Vlachodimos' overall performance in the pre-season convinced manager Rui Vitória to promote him to the starting spot. That season, Vlachodimos was included in UEFA's Champions League breakthrough team of 2018 for making a "string of impressive saves" and being "one of Benfica's brightest sparks in a testing group stage campaign". On 3 February 2019, after 20 consecutive appearances with the club in Primeira Liga, he faced a red card as the last player for a foul committed to Bas Dost in a 4–2 away win over Lisbon rivals Sporting CP. Two weeks later, in the first leg of the UEFA Europa League round of 32 match against Galatasaray, Vlachodimos made a crucial save in the 85th minute to deny Christian Luyindama the equalizer, helping Benfica secure their first win in Turkey (2–1). He was elected Primeira Liga's Goalkeeper of the Month for February. During that month, he competed in four league matches, conceding two goals as Benfica defeated Sporting, Nacional (10–0), Desportivo das Aves (3–0) and Chaves (4–0). Moreover, he also helped his team eliminate Galatasaray 2–1 on aggregate in UEFA Europa League's Round of 32.

Vlachodimos started the 2019–20 season again as a first-choice. On 29 August 2019, he extended his contract with Benfica until 2023, setting an annual salary of €1.2 million. On 5 November 2019, Vlachodimos has been at his best in the Portuguese Primeira Liga for Benfica, recording eight clean sheets in the opening 10 matches of the season. Overall, if we take all competitions during 2019 into account, Vlachodimos participated in 46 matches for Benfica, recording an impressive 21 clean sheets. Only Jan Oblak (24) and Marco Bizot (29) gained more shutouts, while Marc-André ter Stegen also tallied 24 clean sheets.

On 5 October 2020, with the save of two consecutive penalty kicks from Ryan Gauld helped his team prevail over S.C. Farense with a score of 3-2 achieving the third victory in an equal number of matches in the beginning of the 2020-21 season. As a conclusion this season was a reality check for the 27-year-old as he played as a second fiddle to Helton Leite for most of the campaign. He has, however, regained his form and put up some excellent displays in the 2021-22 season. On 26 August 2021, Benfica qualified for the UEFA Champions League group stage after defeating PSV Eindhoven, a justification for the international Greek goalkeeper who in the summer was a step away from "Da Luz".

On 4 November 2021, although he conceded five goals in the 5-2 defeat to FC Bayern Munich, Vlachodimos is included in the top 11 of the 4th matchday in the UEFA Champions League.
 On beginning of December 2021, Newcastle United are reportedly interested in signing highly coveted Benfica goalkeeper Odysseas Vlachodimos. According to the Portuguese outlet O Jogo, Benfica could be battling to keep hold of their star goalkeeper with Newcastle United eyeing a January swoop for the Greek international. The Magpies have identified the 27-year-old as a top target and want to open discussions with the Portuguese giants in the coming weeks ahead of the January transfer window.

On 26 January 2022, the Portuguese press praised Vlachodimos for his performance in the victory of Benfica over Boavista F.C. in the 2021–22 Taça da Liga final, where the Greek goalkeeper was voted man of the match. Benfica were led to the penalty shootout with Boavista (1–1 in the regular game), where they prevailed 3–2, with the 27-year-old goalkeeper repelling three of the five penalties. In fact, this was the first participation of the Greek international in the tournament, while he is in Portugal, while he reached a total of 150 appearances with the Benfica jersey.

On 8 March 2023, the Greek goalkeeper signed a contract that runs until the summer of 2027, with the Portuguese "A Bola" reporting that the agreement between the two sides also includes a release clause of €60 million.

International career

German national youth teams
Vlachodimos represented Germany at various youth levels. His first experience with the national team came on 21 May 2009 when he made his debut for the U15's in a 2–0 win over the United States. He made one more appearance for the U15's against Poland the following month before making his U16 debut in August, starting in a 4–2 win over Switzerland in new manager Steffen Freund's first match in charge at the 2009 U16 Tournament in Liechteinstein. Vlachodimos featured regularly throughout the tournament as Germany claimed the title, beating Austria 6–2 in the final.

Two years later, Vlachodimos helped Germany to a runners-up finish at the 2011 UEFA European Under-17 Championship where they ultimately lost 5–2 to the Netherlands in the final. Soon after the tournament he was awarded the bronze U17 Fritz Walter Medal, awarded to the third best German under-17 player. Later in the year, he was part of the Germany squad which ended third at the 2011 FIFA U-17 World Cup. He made his debut for the U18 side in February 2012 before advancing to the U19 side in August. He then made his U20 debut on 12 October the following year against the Netherlands.

On 15 March 2017, following his emergence as Panathinaikos' first-choice goalkeeper, Vlachodimos was called up by Stefan Kuntz to the U21 side for friendly matches against England and Portugal. He was voted man of the match for his performance during Germany's 1–0 defeat against Portugal, despite the defeat being the nation's first home loss in 32 matches.
Vlachodimos' strong performances at club with Panathinaikos saw him selected in Stefan Kuntz's squad for the 2017 UEFA European U21 final tournament in Poland. Germany were ultimately crowned champions, beating Spain 1–0 in the final to claim the title.

Greece
On 9 November 2018, four days after FIFA's approval of Vlachodimos' request to play for Greece, he was called up by Angelos Anastasiadis for the matches against Finland and Estonia in the UEFA Nations League. He debuted for Greece in a 1–0 win over Finland on 15 November that year.

Career statistics

Club

International

Honours
Benfica
Primeira Liga: 2018–19
Supertaça Cândido de Oliveira: 2019

Germany U21
UEFA European Under-21 Championship: 2017

Individual
Fritz Walter Medal U17 Bronze: 2011
Individual
 Primeira Liga Goalkeeper of the Month: February 2019, September 2022
 Primeira Liga Player Fair-Play Prize: 2021–22

References

External links

Profile at the S.L. Benfica website

1994 births
Living people
Footballers from Stuttgart
Association football goalkeepers
Citizens of Greece through descent
Greek footballers
Greece international footballers
German footballers
Germany youth international footballers
Germany under-21 international footballers
German people of Greek descent
Sportspeople of Greek descent
VfB Stuttgart II players
VfB Stuttgart players
Panathinaikos F.C. players
S.L. Benfica footballers
3. Liga players
Bundesliga players
Super League Greece players
Primeira Liga players
Greek expatriate footballers
Greek expatriate sportspeople in Portugal
German expatriate footballers
German expatriate sportspeople in Portugal